The Oatfield Emerald is a type of chocolate toffee sweet native to Ireland and is considered one of the country's most popular sweets and one of the "iconic names of the Irish sweet world".

They have distinctive green wrappers.

The Oatfield Emerald has been produced since the mid-twentieth century and exported worldwide.

Production moved out of the Republic of Ireland (and the original factory) in 2012.

The image of the young girl on the original wrapped packaging is alleged to be based on Mountcharles native Deborah Cunningham, taken from a sketch drawn by celebrated artist Kevin Sharkey.

References

Chocolate-covered foods
Irish brands
Irish confectionery
Emerald
Toffee